Charles Chandler (23 November 1870 – 1940) was a Jamaican cricketer. He played in eight first-class matches for the Jamaican cricket team from 1894 to 1897.

See also
 List of Jamaican representative cricketers

References

External links
 

1870 births
1940 deaths
Jamaican cricketers
Jamaica cricketers
People from Saint Mary Parish, Jamaica